Live from A&R Studios is an album by the Allman Brothers Band.  It was recorded on August 26, 1971, at A&R Studios in New York City for a live radio broadcast.  It was released on April 1, 2016.

A bootleg recording of this concert had been circulated for years, and coveted by many fans. Originally, "You Don't Love Me" / "Soul Serenade" was released on the box set Dreams.

Critical reception
On Jambands.com, Larson Sutton said, "The nine-song program was inspired work, showcasing the conflagration of six musicians focused as one... The A&R show, presumably taped in droves by home stereos, was widely bootlegged, and in the following decades considered quite a treasure of both performance and historical context. To have it officially released, cleaned up and remastered to a high polish from the original broadcast tapes, is to put it finally in the proper place for all to hear; the magnificence of the Allman Brothers Band in one of its finest hours of its finest year of 1971."

In American Songwriter, Hal Horowitz wrote, "As those who already own this heavily bootlegged concert, recorded in front of a small audience at the titular studio can attest, the sextet was on fire this evening. And even though there were few surprises in the songs played (they had stayed pretty similar for about a year), the group charged through the material like they had everything to prove.... Moderate Brothers admirers can stick with the already released versions, but for those digging deeper into Duane’s sadly limited well of professionally recorded work with the band, this is absolutely essential listening."

Track listing 
 "Statesboro Blues" (Blind Willie McTell) – 4:30	
 "Trouble No More" (McKinley Morganfield) – 4:04	
 "Don't Keep Me Wonderin'" (Gregg Allman) – 3:39	
 "Done Somebody Wrong" (Clarence L. Lewis, Elmore James, Morris Levy) – 3:43	
 "One Way Out" (Marshall Sehorn, Elmore James) – 4:48
 "In Memory of Elizabeth Reed" (Dickey Betts) – 11:23
 "Stormy Monday" (T-Bone Walker) – 8:48	
 Medley: "You Don't Love Me" / "Soul Serenade" (Willie Cobbs / Curtis Ousley, Luther Dixon) – 19:32	
 "Hot 'Lanta" (Gregg Allman, Duane Allman, Dickey Betts, Butch Trucks, Barry Oakley, Jai Johanny Johanson) – 6:46

Personnel
The Allman Brothers Band
Duane Allman – lead and slide guitar
Gregg Allman – Hammond B-3 organ, piano, vocals
Dickey Betts – lead guitar
Berry Oakley – bass guitar
Butch Trucks – drums, timpani
Jaimoe – drums, percussion
Production
Produced by the Allman Brothers Band
Executive producer: Bert Holman
Project supervisor: Bill Levenson
Mixing: Suha Gur
Liner notes: John Lynskey
Package design: Terry Bradley
Photos: Baron Wolman, W. Robert Johnson, Wayne Knight

References

2016 live albums
The Allman Brothers Band live albums